D. J. Morrell (born August 19, 1991) is an American football offensive guard who is currently a free agent. He was most recently a member of the Buffalo Bills.

References

External links
Career transactions 
Old Dominion Monarchs bio

Living people
1991 births
Players of American football from Connecticut
American football offensive guards
Old Dominion Monarchs football players
Sportspeople from Norwalk, Connecticut
Norwalk High School (Connecticut) alumni